Teymur Suri-ye Olya (also Romanized as Teymūr Sūrī-ye ‘Olyā) is a village in Firuzabad Rural District, Firuzabad District, Selseleh County, Lorestan Province, Iran. At the 2006 census, its population was 231, in 49 families.

References 

Towns and villages in Selseleh County